Jim Powell is Senior Fellow at a libertarian think tank, the Cato Institute in Washington, D.C., with which he has been associated since 1988. He has also done work for the Manhattan Institute, the Institute for Humane Studies, Citizens for a Sound Economy, the National Right to Work Committee and Americans for Free Choice in Medicine.

Powell is an published author, writing several books on the unintended consequences of presidential policies, including FDR's Folly, a critical look on Franklin D. Roosevelt's New Deal policies. He has also given talks at American universities such as Harvard and Stanford, as well as internationally.

Biography
Born in Norfolk, Virginia and growing up on Long Island, Powell attended the University of Chicago where he earned a B.A. in history. As an editor of the student quarterly New Individualist Review, helping publish articles by several future Nobel Laureates. Powell also worked as a researcher for future Nobel Laureate Ronald H. Coase.

In 1976, Powell began to publish his writings, with early books primarily focused on topics about the art market, commercial real estate, and Japanese finance. By the late 1980s, he began to author books on libertarian issues.

Powell has been apart of multiple libertarian Think Tanks, including Cato Institute.

Books
 The Fight For Liberty, Critical Lessons From Liberty's Greatest Champions Of The Last 2,000 Years (2012)
 Greatest Emancipations, How the West Abolished Slavery (2008) 
 Bully Boy: The Truth about Theodore Roosevelt's Legacy (2006) 
 Wilson's War: How Woodrow Wilson's Great Blunder Led to Hitler, Lenin, Stalin, and World War II (2005) 
 FDR's Folly: How Roosevelt and His New Deal Prolonged the Great Depression (2003) 
 The Triumph of Liberty: A 2,000-Year History Told through the Lives of Freedom's Greatest Champions (2000) 
 Gnomes of Tokyo (1988) 
 Risk, Ruin and Riches: Inside the World of Big-Time Real Estate (1986) 
 An Investor's Guide to Under-Valued Art and Antiques (1983)

References

External links
 About Jim Powell
 Cato Institute Biography
 

Year of birth missing (living people)
Living people
University of Chicago alumni
21st-century American historians
21st-century American male writers
American libertarians
Libertarian historians
American political writers
American male non-fiction writers
Cato Institute people